Constitutional law is a body of law which defines the role, powers, and structure of different entities within a state.

Constitutional Law may also refer to:
 International constitutional law
 Constitutional theory

National constitutional laws
 Federal Constitutional Law (Austria)
 Australian constitutional law
 Canadian constitutional law
 Constitutional laws of Italy, an Act of Parliament that has the same strength as the Constitution of Italy. 
 French constitutional law of 23 July 2008
 South African constitutional law
 United Kingdom constitutional law
 United States constitutional law

See also
 List of national constitutions
 Constitution Act (disambiguation)